The 2015–16 Boston Bruins season was the Bruins' 92nd season in the National Hockey League (NHL). The season began its regular games on October 8, 2015 against the Winnipeg Jets with a 6–2 loss. One all-time franchise achievement the Bruins attained this season is shared by only their greatest rival, the Canadiens - a total of 3,000 wins in the team's existence, achieved by the Bruins on January 8, 2016 in a 4–1 road victory against the New Jersey Devils. However, the Bruins missed the playoffs for the second straight season, and missed the playoffs in back-to-back years for the first time in a decade.
As of 2023, this represents the most recent season not making the Stanley Cup playoffs for the Bruins.

Standings

Schedule and results

Pre-season

Regular season

Player stats 
Final stats

Skaters

Goaltenders

†Denotes player spent time with another team before joining Bruins. Stats reflect time with the Bruins only.
‡Denotes player was traded mid-season. Stats reflect time with the Bruins only.

Suspensions/fines

Awards and honours

Awards

Milestones

Transactions 
The Bruins have been involved in the following transactions during the 2015–16 season:

Trades

Free agents acquired

Free agents lost

Claimed via waivers

Lost via waivers

Player signings

Draft picks

Below are the Boston Bruins' selections at the 2015 NHL Entry Draft, to be held on June 26–27, 2015 at the BB&T Center in Sunrise, Florida.

Draft notes

 The Los Angeles Kings' first round pick went to the Boston Bruins as the result of a trade on June 26, 2015, that sent Milan Lucic to Los Angeles in exchange for Martin Jones, Colin Miller and this pick.
 The Calgary Flames' first and second-round picks went to the Boston Bruins as the result of a trade on June 26, 2015, that sent Dougie Hamilton to Calgary in exchange for Calgary and Washington's second-round picks in 2015 (45th and 52nd overall) and this pick.
 The Philadelphia Flyers' second-round pick went to the Boston Bruins as the result of a trade on October 4, 2014, that sent Johnny Boychuk to New York in exchange for a second-round pick in 2016, a conditional third-round pick in 2015 and this pick.
 The Boston Bruins' second-round pick went to the Tampa Bay Lightning as the result of a trade on March 2, 2015, that sent Brett Connolly to Boston in exchange for a second-round pick in 2016 and this pick.
 The Washington Capitals' second-round pick went to the Boston Bruins as the result of a trade on June 26, 2015 that sent Dougie Hamilton to Calgary in exchange for a first and second-round pick in 2015 (15th and 45th overall) and this pick.
Calgary previously acquired this pick as the result of a trade on March 1, 2015 that sent Curtis Glencross to Washington in exchange for a third-round pick in 2015 and this pick.
 The Boston Bruins' fifth-round pick went to the Minnesota Wild as the result of a trade on June 26, 2015, that exchanged Minnesota's fifth-round pick in 2016 for this pick.

References

Boston Bruins seasons
Boston Bruins
Boston Bruins
Boston Bruins
Boston Bruins
Bruins
Bruins